Jacobs Peninsula is a massive peninsula,  long and  wide, extending east from Nash Range into the Ross Ice Shelf, Antarctica. It was named by the Advisory Committee on Antarctic Names after Stanley S. Jacobs, an oceanographer at Columbia University's Lamont–Doherty Earth Observatory, who made physical/chemical observations in the Southern Ocean, including the Ross Sea area, between 1963 and 2000.

References

Peninsulas of Antarctica
Shackleton Coast